Karamendy, until 1999 known as Dokuchayevka, is a village in Naurzum District, Kostanay Region, Kazakhstan. It is the administrative center of the Naurzum District, as well as of the Karamendy Rural District (KATO code - 395830100). Population:   The administrative office of the Naurzum Nature Reserve, a protected area, is located in the village.

Geography
Karamendy is located by road P-284, about  WNW of lake Zharman.

References

Populated places in Kostanay Region